This is a list of public art in Evansville, Indiana.

This list applies only to works of public art accessible in an outdoor public space. It does not include artwork in a museum.

Most of the works mentioned are sculptures. When this is not the case (i.e., sound installations, for example) it is stated next to the title.

Evansville

References

Tourist attractions in Evansville, Indiana
Evansville
Evansville, Indiana